André du Pon (30 August 1924, in Amsterdam – 24 May 2006, in Medemblik) was a sailor from the Netherlands] who was three times chef d'équipe for the Dutch Olympic Sailing team. Du Pon led his teams during the 1976 Olympics in Kingston, Ontario, the 1984 Olympics in Long Beach and the 1988 Olympics in Pusan.

After sailing the Finn Du Pon was also one of the first Soling sailors of the Netherlands. He owned the Soling H 4.

Controversy
During the selection for the Dutch Olympic Sailing Team for the 1976 Olympics a controversy emerged between twelve sailors and the selection committee chaired by Du Pon. This discussion focussed on the role of Frieda Vollebergt who did the communication for the sailing team. As mother of Erik Vollebregt, Sjoerd Vollebregt and Peter Vollebregt - all three candidates for the 1976 Olympic sailing event - she was accused of having a bias towards her children in the communication. In the end Fred Imhoff and Heike Blok lost the lawsuit and were removed from the 1976 selection.

Political career
Du Pon was in the period 1990 - 1998 and from 2002 - 2006 alderman for the liberal party VVD in Medemblik. During those periods he held several times the position of deputy mayor.

Sources

 
 
 
 
 
 
 
 
 
 
 
 
 
 
 
 
 
 
 
 
 
 
 
 
 
 

1924 births
2006 deaths
Sportspeople from Amsterdam
Dutch male sailors (sport)
Soling class sailors
Dutch referees and umpires